The Rural Municipality of Norton No. 69 is a rural municipality (RM) in the Canadian province of Saskatchewan within Census Division No. 2 and  Division No. 2. It is located in the southeast portion of the province.

History 
The RM of Norton No. 69 incorporated as a rural municipality on December 13, 1909.

Geography

Communities and localities 
The following urban municipalities are surrounded by the RM.

Villages
 Pangman, (seat of municipality)

The following unincorporated communities]] are within the RM.

Localities
Amulet (dissolved as a village, January 1, 1965)
Khedive (dissolved as a village January 1, 2002)
Forward (dissolved as a village, December 31, 1947)
Moreland
Wallace

Demographics 

Government 
The RM of Norton No. 69 is governed by an elected municipal council and an appointed administrator that meets on the second Wednesday of every month. The reeve of the RM is Tom Webb while its administrator is Patti Gurskey. The RM's office is located in Pangman.

References 

N

Division No. 2, Saskatchewan